Pellegrino Albanese (born 4 February 1991) is an Italian professional footballer who plays for Serie D side F.C. Matese.

Club career

Born in Avellino, Campania, Albanese started his career at Basilicata team Anastasio Salvatore (in Pignola). In 2007, he was loaned to F.C. Internazionale Milano, where he played as a midfielder. Despite not being a regular member of the Allievi Nazionali (under-17 team), Inter bought him but loaned Albanese to Sassuolo along with Umberto Bellani and Giorgio Schiavini. In August 2009, Sassuolo signed him on a free transfer and also loaned a number of other footballers from Inter, such as Alberto Gallinetta and Mame Baba Thiam. Albanese was a regular member for Sassuolo's Primavera (under-20 team). He plays as a right back.

Albanese made his first team debut on 27 March 2011. He came on as a substitute for Daniele Quadrini in the second half. At that time Sassuolo was already losing 0–3. The game was eventually won by Siena (4–0).

In July 2011, Albanese was transferred to newly promoted Italian fourth division club Mantova in a co-ownership deal along with Andrea Vignali. He played 3 out of the first 4 rounds of the 2011–12 Lega Pro Seconda Divisione season as an emergency left back. However, he then did not play a part in any subsequent games as the team had Inter youth product Andrea Bertin as right-back and Davide Bersi as left-back.

Following this experience, Albanese decided to start a new adventure away from Italy and decided to accept an offer from Malta. In October 2013, he joined Maltese Division 1 side Msida Saint-Joseph F.C. where he was the first signing of newly instated president, Carmine Ferrara.

Honours
Inter youth team
 Campionato Allievi Nazionali: 2008

References

External links
 
 

Italian footballers
Italian expatriate footballers
Association football fullbacks
People from Avellino
1991 births
Living people
U.S. Sassuolo Calcio players
Mantova 1911 players
Msida Saint-Joseph F.C. players
Taranto F.C. 1927 players
A.S.D. Nocerina 1910 players
A.S.D. Football Club Matese players
Serie B players
Serie C players
Serie D players
Italian expatriate sportspeople in Malta
Expatriate footballers in Malta
Footballers from Campania
Sportspeople from the Province of Avellino
21st-century Italian people